The superior auricular muscle is a muscle above the auricle of the outer ear. It originates from the epicranial aponeurosis, and inserts into the upper part of the medial surface of the auricle. It draws the auricle upwards.

Structure 
The superior auricular muscle originates from the epicranial aponeurosis. Its fibres converge to be inserted by a thin, flattened tendon into the upper part of the medial surface of the auricle of the outer ear.

It is the largest of the three auriculares muscles. It is thin and fan-shaped.

Nerve supply 
The superior auricular muscle is supplied by the temporal branch of the facial nerve (VII).

Additional images

See also 

 Anterior auricular muscle
 Posterior auricular muscle

References 

Muscles of the head and neck